Yamilé Martínez Calderón (born November 11, 1970 in Cueto, Holguín) is a women's basketball player from Cuba. Playing as a center she won the gold medal with the Cuba women's national basketball team at the 2003 Pan American Games in Santo Domingo, Dominican Republic. 

Martínez also competed for her native country at three consecutive Summer Olympics, starting in 1992 (Barcelona, Spain), finishing in fourth, sixth and ninth place in the final rankings. Her first name is sometimes also spelled as Yamilet.

References
FIBA Profile
 sports-reference

1970 births
Living people
Cuban women's basketball players
Basketball players at the 1992 Summer Olympics
Basketball players at the 1996 Summer Olympics
Basketball players at the 2000 Summer Olympics
Olympic basketball players of Cuba
Basketball players at the 2003 Pan American Games
Basketball players at the 2007 Pan American Games
Pan American Games gold medalists for Cuba
Pan American Games bronze medalists for Cuba
Pan American Games medalists in basketball
Centers (basketball)
Medalists at the 2003 Pan American Games
Medalists at the 2007 Pan American Games
People from Holguín Province